Plasma is Trey Anastasio's first live album. The two-disc set features live tracks recorded during Trey's summer and fall tour in 2002 with his dectet, which included a guitar, bass, saxophones, trumpet, trombone, tuba, flute, percussion, keyboards, and drums. Plasma was released on April 29, 2003.

Track listing

Note: Disc 2 track 3 ("Inner Tube") is constructed from portions of the "Mr. Completely" and "Money, Love and Change" jams played at the June 6, 2002 show in Chicago.

References

Trey Anastasio albums
2003 live albums
Elektra Records live albums